A startup ecosystem is formed by people, startups in their various stages and various types of organizations in a location (physical or virtual), interacting as a system to create and scale new startup companies. These organizations can be further divided into categories such as universities, funding organizations, support organizations (like incubators, accelerators, co-working spaces etc.), research organizations, service provider organizations (like legal, financial services etc.) and large corporations. Local Governments and Government organizations such as Commerce / Industry / Economic Development departments also play an important role in startup ecosystem. Different organizations typically focus on specific parts of the ecosystem function and startups at their specific development stage(s).

Composition of the startup ecosystem

 Ideas, inventions and research i.e. Intellectual property rights (IPR)
 Entrepreneurship Education
 Startups at various stages
 Entrepreneurs
 Start up team members
 Angel investors
 Startup mentors
 Startup advisors
 Other business-oriented people 
 People from other organizations with start-up activities
 Startup events

List of organizations and/or organized activities with startup activities
 Universities
 Students

 Advisory and mentoring organizations
 Startup incubators
 Startup accelerators
 Coworking spaces
 Service providers (Consulting, Accounting, Legal, etc.)
 Event organizers
 Start-up competitions
 Startup Business Model Evaluators
 Business Angel Networks
 Venture capital companies
 Equity Crowdfunding portals
 Corporates (telcos, banking, health, food, etc.)
 Other funding providers (loans, grants etc.)
 Start-up blogs and social networks
 Other facilitators

Investors from these roles are linked together through shared events, activities, locations and interactions. Startup ecosystems generally encompass the network of interactions between people, organizations, and their environment. Any particular start-up ecosystem is defined by its collection of specific cities or online communities.

In addition, resources like skills, time and money are also essential components of a start-up ecosystem. The resources that flow through ecosystems are obtained primarily from the meetings between people and organizations that are an active part of those startup ecosystems. These interactions help to create new potential startups and/or to strengthen the already existing ones. There are a few common mistakes that entrepreneurs make that end up costing them their business, like inability to secure adequate funding, sudden market downturn and a poor scaling plan.

External and internal factors
Startup ecosystems are controlled by both external and internal factors. External factors, such as financial climate, big market disruptions, and significant transitions, control the overall structure of an ecosystem and the way things work within it. Start-up ecosystems are dynamic entities that progress from formation stages to periodic disturbances (like the financial bubbles) and then to recovering processes.

Several researchers have created lists of essential internal attributes for startup ecosystems. Spigel suggests that ecosystems require cultural attributes (a culture of entrepreneurship and histories of successful entrepreneurship), social attributes that are accessed through social ties (worker talent, investment capital, social networks, and entrepreneurial mentors) and material attributes grounded in a specific places (government policies, universities, support services, physical infrastructure, and open local markets). Stam distinguishes between framework conditions of ecosystems (formal institutions, culture, physical infrastructure, and market demand) with systematic conditions of networks, leadership, finance, talent, knowledge, and support services. 

Startup ecosystems in similar environments but located in different parts of the world can end up doing things differently simply because they have a different entrepreneurial culture and resource pool. The introduction of non-native peoples' knowledge and skills can also cause substantial shifts in the ecosystem's functions.

Internal factors act as feedback loops inside any particular startup ecosystem. They not only control ecosystem processes, but are also controlled by them. While some of the resource inputs are generally controlled by external processes like financial climate and market disruptions, the availability of resources within the ecosystem are controlled by every organization's ability to contribute towards the ecosystem. Although people exist and operate within ecosystems, their cumulative effects are large enough to influence external factors like financial climate.

Role of employee diversity
Employee diversity also affects startup ecosystem functions, as do the processes of disturbance and succession. Startup Ecosystems provide a variety of goods and services upon which other people and companies depend on. Thus, the principles of start-up ecosystem management suggest that rather than managing individual people or organizations, resources should be managed at the level of the startup ecosystem itself. Classifying start-up ecosystems into structurally similar units is an important step towards effective ecosystem managing.

Startup ecosystem studies

There are several independent studies made to evaluate start-up ecosystems to better understand and compare various start-up ecosystems and to offer valuable insights of the strengths and weaknesses of different start-up ecosystems. Startup ecosystems can be studied through a variety of approaches - theoretical studies, studies monitoring specific start-up ecosystems over long periods of time and those that look at differences between start-up ecosystems to elucidate how they work.

Since 2012, San Francisco-based Startup Genome has been the first organization to release comprehensive research reports that benchmark startup ecosystems globally. Currently led by JF Gauthier and Marc Penzel, the San Francisco-based startup has been the first organization to capture the requirements of a startup ecosystem in a data-driven framework. Startup Genome's work influenced startup policies globally and is supported by thought leaders such as Steve Blank and has appeared in leading business media such as The Economist, Bloomberg and Harvard Business Review.

References

Notes

Further reading
 A Beginner's Guide to the Nordic Startup Ecosystem – Forbes
 Knowledge Commercialization and Valorization in Regional Economic Development
 Startup Weekend: How to Take a Company From Concept to Creation in 54 Hours – Marc Nager, Clint Nelsen, Franck Nouyrigat
 Startup Ecosystem Angel Network

Entrepreneurship
Venture capital
Ecosystems
Types of business entity